The Groupe de Bruges is a European think-tank specializing in agriculture and rural development. One of its founding members, Dacian Cioloş, served as European Commissioner for Agriculture from 2010 to 2014 and later as Prime Minister of Romania.

The Groupe summarizes its own mission  as "to provide an independent, positive and constructive criticism of the CAP".

History 

The Groupe de Bruges was created in 1995 by Edgard Pisani and Bertrand Hervieu as a Europe-wide successor to the French Groupe de Seillac (1992-5). The latter had been formed in the context of the debate on reform of the European Union's Common Agricultural Policy in the early 1990s. Through its life, the Groupe has enjoyed funding from the Swiss Charles-Leopold Mayer foundation.

In 1996 the Groupe published the book Agriculture at a Turning Point in France, Spain and the Netherlands. A second edition of the book was published in 2002 in those countries as well as Italy and Bulgaria. On at least two occasions, the Groupe has attempted to influence public opinion through open letters to the European Parliament. Members of the group took part in the agriculture-related work of the 2001-3 Convention on the Future of Europe.

By 2003, it had grown to include 25 members from 22 European countries, including several from Central and Eastern Europe which, at the time, were not yet members of the European Union.

Notable members 

 Dacian Cioloş: Romanian minister of Agriculture (2007-8) and European Commissioner-designate for Agriculture and Rural Development in the Barroso II college (2010-14)
 Bertrand Hervieu: Former Secretary General of the International Centre for Advanced Mediterranean Agronomic Studies (CIHEAM)
 Edgard Pisani: French minister of Agriculture 1961-6

References

External links
 Homepage of the Groupe de Bruges

1995 establishments in Europe
Think tanks based in Belgium